Bihadi is a Rural municipality located within the Parbat District of the Gandaki Province of Nepal.
The rural municipality spans  of area, with a total population of 13,403 according to a 2011 Nepal census.

On March 10, 2017, the Government of Nepal restructured the local level bodies into 753 new local level structures.
The previous Bahaki Thanti, Bachchha, Barachaur, Ranipani, Urampokhara and Saligram VDCs were merged to form Bihadi Rural Municipality.
Bihadi is divided into 6 wards, with Bahaki Thanti declared the administrative center of the rural municipality.

Demographics
At the time of the 2011 Nepal census, Bihadi Rural Municipality had a population of 13,409. Of these, 90.0% spoke Nepali, 6.3% Magar, 3.3% Gurung, 0.3% Newar and 0.1% other languages as their first language.

In terms of ethnicity/caste, 42.3% were Hill Brahmin, 10.4% Chhetri, 10.4% Magar, 9.7% Sarki, 6.7% Kami, 5.7% Damai/Dholi,  3.6% Gurung, 3.3% Sanyasi/Dasnami 2.7% Newar and 5.2% others.

In terms of religion, 90.8% were Hindu, 8.8% Buddhist, 0.2% Muslim, 0.1% Christian and 0.1% others.

References

External links
official website of the rural municipality

Rural municipalities in Parbat District
Rural municipalities of Nepal established in 2017